Ant Forest (Chinese: 蚂蚁森林, pinyin: Mǎyǐ sēnlín) is a campaign launched on the Alipay mobile client by Ant Financial Services Group in August 2016. It encourages users to lower carbon emissions by planting trees when users engage in activities that reduce carbon emissions.

By August 27, 2019, 122 million trees had been planted in China by Ant Forest.

Background
The world faces serious environmental challenges. As environmental pressures grow, global ecosystems are severely damaged. The Paris Agreement recognizes the collective nature of the historic challenge of reducing carbon emissions. As an important economic force in the world, China also faces great challenges. In the process of transitioning to a more low-carbon lifestyle, the use of digital technology in the financial sector plays a key role and some progress has been made, but green finance still has great potential for development. The development of new digital technologies and the innovation of forms attract more citizens to participate directly in green financing. In this case, in August 2016, Ant Financial launched the Ant Forest Program.

Application
The purpose of ant forest activity is to convert simulated energy into real trees. Ant Financial evaluates the personal behavior data of participating users, including transportation, entertainment, and utility payments. For example, users can save carbon emissions from going out to buy train tickets by buying train tickets online. Convert "avoid carbon emissions" below the scheduled carbon emission standard into a user's virtual energy stored in a personal Ant Forest account, where virtual energy accumulates in a certain amount and can be exchanged online for different types of trees or protected areas, and then Ant Financial works with its ecological partners to plant a real tree in the desert.

Users could see the trees they planted through a satellite map. According to Gong Zhang, a former NASA scientist and the founder of GAGO Inc., it should be hard to see the saplings because of the low resolution of satellite, but millions of saplings have been planted so we could see the changes they brought to the world. Alipay hopes to cultivate and encourage users to stick to a low-carbon lifestyle through this way.

In May 2017, the app reached 200 million users.

As of August 2017, 1.22 million tons carbon emissions had been reduced and 10.25 million trees had been planted.

Development
On September 5, 2017, Ant Forest released a plan called "Planet Blue" at its "Bluer Sky" forum of the public benefit activities week. This plan would open product capabilities and technology platform to the whole society and urge everyone to participate in a green future. This project tries to transform itself into an incubator of social charity innovation. The CEO of Ant Financial Services Group Xiandong Jin said:" Public benefit activities are right around us. The power of mobile Internet technology is available to everyone and makes everyone's actions into possible. Technology is the greatest public welfare of this era". He also pointed out that mobile Internet allows individuals to translate their daily low-carbon behaviors into green energy, whilst the use of technologies such as remote sensing satellite and artificial intelligent technology could help commonweal organizations to manage forest ecology better and make public benefits more real and transparent. The new plan of Ant Forest would encourage more access to low-carbon scenarios and await the NPO, government agencies, international organizations and other partners to join into this public benefit innovation.

According to Wang Zu, the product manager of the Ant Financial Services Group, the plan was more than finding trees and preserves and union of brands, it was a vision of achieving the open of the whole industry chain, which could connect all the green scenes and resources with everyone's actions on the platform.

As of August 2019, more than 500 million people have joined the Alipay Ant Forest Green Program, planting more than 100 million trees and reducing carbon emissions by 7.92 million tons, covering a total area of 112,000 hectares in northwest China.

Cooperation
On January 19, 2017, Ant Financial and the United Nations Environment Programme (UNEP) launched the world's first green digital financial alliance during the Davos World Economic Forum, with the aim of harnessing digital technology to promoting financing that addresses global environmental challenges. The collaboration marked the UNEP's first joint venture with a Chinese company since it was established 45 years ago. The Sustainable Digital Finance Alliance (The Green Digital Finance Alliance) is registered as not-for-profit in Geneva and focuses on knowledge and policy recommendations and harnessing a global network of actors to undertake rapid and higher risk experimentation and challenges to address the potential for digital finance and fintech-powered business innovations to reshape the financial system in ways that better align it with the needs of sustainable development.

The United Nations Development Program (UNDP) released a report on China's carbon market on February 17 and specifically analyzed Ant Forest, the world's largest platform for gathering data on individuals' efforts to reduce their carbon footprints. The UNDP’s report said the Chinese platform has “a special significance in enhancing personal contribution to the global response to climate change”.

Reward
The app won the award for Ali Annual Outstanding Public Benefit Activity Project.

On September 19, 2019, the app won the UN Champions of the Earth award, the United Nations’ top environmental honour in inspiration and action category.

Social implications
Maosheng Duan (the director of the China Carbon Market Research Center Tsinghua University and the former chairman of the executive board of the Clean Development Mechanism (CDM)) said that Ant Forest have taken a pioneering step towards promoting ordinary people to reduce carbon emissions at consumer-sides. Ant Forest would make more contributions to the environment and public benefits in China and even the world. Also, it would become a typical duplicable project.

Zhenping Huang (the assistant to the president of the Institute For Philanthropy Tsinghua University) believed that in the era of technology, the public benefit activities could reshape personal habits as well as affect cooperations and interactions among social groups profoundly. Such crossover collision provides the most fertile soil to innovation of public benefits.

Carbon Trading
Man-induced global climate change has become a prominent political issue. Dangerous climate change caused by rising greenhouse gas concentrations has a serious impact on global ecosystems, and governments are seeking mitigation measures and solutions. Market-based carbon trading is emerging as the most popular government strategy. Carbon trading refers to the economic action of trading carbon dioxide emissions rights as a commodity and in accordance with market mechanisms in order to reduce global greenhouse gas emissions, and in the 1990s European governments began to limit corporate emissions by directly regulating and imposing carbon taxes. In 2005, the EU formed its own carbon trading system. Between 1997 and 2001, The Kyoto Protocol encourages governments to develop carbon trading plans. Carbon permits have rapidly grown into an important financial instrument on the market with billions of dollars a year.

China is the world's second-largest emitter of greenhouse gases and is regarded by many countries as the most promising market for emission reduction. The Kyoto Protocol limits countries' greenhouse gas emissions in the form of regulations. Ant Forest is the world's largest platform for personal carbon accounts, which record each person's low-carbon behavior in quantitative terms. According to Chenlong, Chief Strategy Officer of Ant Forests, if individual carbon reduction activities can form a nationally recognized methodology and incorporate China's voluntary emission reduction project (CCER), it will become a "carbon account" for individuals to participate in carbon trading in the future, participating in the future trading and investment in the carbon market. In addition, as of August 2019, Ant Forest users have reached 500 million, Ant Financial and the largest entrepreneurial environmental organization, SEE public welfare organization, the actual planting of more than 100 million trees in China's northwest region, a cumulative reduction of carbon emissions of 7.92 million tons, these reduced  emissions will also be a huge asset in the carbon market. In the future, sustainable investment will be a means of generating long-term returns.

References

External links
 Aerial Ant Forest

Alibaba Group
Ecology of China
2016 establishments in China